The 1996–97 Providence Friars men's basketball team represented Providence College during the 1996–97 NCAA Division I men's basketball season. Led by head coach Pete Gillen, the Friars finished the season 24–12 (10–8 Big East) and received an at-large bid to the NCAA tournament as the 10 seed in the Southeast region. The team made a run to the Elite Eight before losing to eventual National champion Arizona, 96–92 in OT.

Roster

Schedule and results

|-
!colspan=12 style=| Regular season

|-
!colspan=12 style=| Big East Tournament

|-
!colspan=12 style=| NCAA Tournament

Rankings

NBA draft

External links 
 1997 Providence College Basketball Yearbook

References

Providence Friars men's basketball seasons
Providence
Providence